Demetrius (died 20 February 1387), was a Hungarian cardinal and politician, who served as archbishop of Esztergom and bishop of Zagreb and Transylvania, and chancellor.

Origins and early career 

Nothing is known about the origin of Demetrius, who would rise to the highest ecclesiastical titles, but it is presumed that he came from a family of peasants. His father was a certain Peter. Other historians claimed he belonged to the Kaplon of Kaplai kindreds, or was a member of the Bajoni noble family. Towards the end of his life, he appeared in contemporary sources as Demetrius of Vaskút, after receiving land donations in Nógrád and Gömör Counties in 1381.

Along with his brother Philip, he was raised together with King Charles I's eldest son, Louis, who would become King Louis I in 1342. In 1356, he became Keeper of the Seals thus permanently belonged to the escort of Louis I. Three years later, he was put in charge of the royal treasury. In this capacity, he oversaw the treasury's goods and gifts (munera), and also retained and stored the royal charters on estate donations. According to historian Pál Engel, the office of treasurer was emerged into permanent status by 1377, possibly on the initiative of Demetrius himself. At this time, he began his ecclesiastical career, becoming canon of Pécs in 1363 and provost of Eger. In July 1364, Pope Urban V appointed him bishop of Syrmia but Demetrius did not assume the office until 1 April 1365. On 28 June 1368, Demetrius was also made bishop of Transylvania. During his tenure as bishop of Transylvania, Demetrius had a cloister built for the Order of Saint Paul the First Hermit. From May to July 1375, he was also mentioned as secret chancellor in the royal court. In the same year, he participated in negotiations over the future marriage of Sigismund of Luxemburg and Princess Mary.

As chancellor and cardinal 

Demetrius, recently created Chancellor of the Kingdom (a post he would hold until his death), had to leave the court having been given the bishopric of Zagreb by Pope Gregory XI on 23 January 1376. On 16 August 1378, Pope Urban VI appointed him archbishop of Esztergom and made him a cardinal and titular cardinal-priest of Santi Quattro Coronati on 18 October. Demetrius never visited Rome as a cardinal and became papal ambassador in Hungary. As (lord) chancellor, Demetrius was also head of the newly emerged court of special presence (a predecessor institution of the chief justice), however the judicial function was performed by his deputies (the most notable one was John of Küküllő). As archbishop of Esztergom, Demetrius officiated at the funeral of King Louis I on 16 September 1382 and crowned Mary, Louis I's elder daughter and successor on the Hungarian throne, the following day in Székesfehérvár Basilica. In 1384, Cardinal Demetrius travelled to Poland with significant armed escort, accompanying Louis I's younger daughter, Saint Hedwig, who had been elected to succeed her father on the throne of Poland.

In August 1385, the Archbishop performed the marriage ceremony between Queen Mary and Sigismund of Luxembourg, thus infuriating the Queen's mother and regent, Elizabeth of Bosnia. The queen dowager wanted to retaliate to the marriage by trying to deprive the archbishop of his see. Sigismund soon left the kingdom, enabling the Hungarian nobility to invite King Charles III of Naples, the heir male of Louis I, to claim the throne. Charles successfully invaded Hungary and dethroned Mary. On 31 December 1385, Demetrius crowned him king of Hungary in the presence of the former queen, Mary, and the queen dowager, Elizabeth. However, Queen Elizabeth had King Charles II stabbed to death in her apartments in February 1386. Sigismund returned to Hungary shortly after to be crowned king as Mary's co-ruler, but Demetrius died before the coronation took place.

References

Sources

External links 

 Gcatholic.org

|-

|-

|-

|-

1387 deaths
Archbishops of Esztergom
14th-century Roman Catholic bishops in Croatia
14th-century Hungarian cardinals
Year of birth unknown
Royal treasurers (Kingdom of Hungary)
Bishops of Zagreb
14th-century Roman Catholic bishops in Hungary
14th-century Hungarian people
Bishops of Transylvania